Mường Lát is a district (huyện) of Thanh Hóa province in the North Central Coast region of Vietnam.

As of 2018, the district had a population of 41,640. The district covers an area of 810.65 km². The district capital lies at Mường Lát town.

Municipalities

References

Districts of Thanh Hóa province